St. Hyacinth's Church may refer to:

 Basilica of Saint Hyacinth, Chicago, Illinois, United States
 St. Hyacinth's Cathedral, Saint-Hyacinthe, Canada
 St. Hyacinth's Church, Vyborg, Russia
 St. Hyacinth's Church, Warsaw, Poland
 St. Hyacinth's Church, Wierzbica Górna, Poland
 St Protus and St Hyacinth's Church, Blisland, a Grade I listed parish church in Blisland, Cornwall, England

See also
 St. Hyacinth (disambiguation)